Maud Le Car is a professional surfer and model.

Early life 
She was born in Saint Martin in the French Caribbean on 1992.

Career 
In 2015, she was ranked 15 in the world. In 2016, she won two events of World Surf League held in California and Israel.

References 

French female surfers
French surfers
1992 births
Living people
Saint Martinois sportspeople
People from Landes (department)